Trigonopterus allopatricus is a species of flightless weevil in the genus Trigonopterus from Indonesia.

Etymology
The specific name is derived from Greek allos, meaning "other", and Latin patria, meaning "homeland".  The name refers to the species' fragmented habitats.

Description
The body is elongated, with the holotype measuring 2.60mm long.  General coloration is black with rust-colored legs and head.

Range

References

allopatricus
Beetles described in 2014
Beetles of Asia